Palladium(II) iodide is an inorganic compound of palladium and iodine. It is commercially available, though less common than palladium(II) chloride, the usual entry point to palladium chemistry.

Historically, the quantity of palladium in a sample may be determined gravimetrically by precipitation as palladium(II) iodide. Unlike the chloride and bromide, palladium(II) iodide is not quite as soluble in excess iodide.

Properties 
Palladium(II) iodide is insoluble in water by itself, but in the presence of excess iodide it may dissolve due to the formation of the PdI42− anion. While in solution, it can act as a catalyst in some organic reactions.

References

Palladium compounds
Iodides
Platinum group halides